Peter Högardh (born May 25, 1976) is a Swedish retired professional ice hockey right winger.

Career
Högardh made his professional debut in 1993 for Västra Frölunda of the Elitserien. Högardh was drafted by the New York Islanders, 203rd overall, in the 1994 NHL Entry Draft. In 1996, he moved to Finland to play in the SM-liiga for Lukko and Kiekko-Espoo before returning to Sweden two years later for second-tier side Rögle BK.

In 2000, Högardh returned to Elitserien with MODO Hockey, staying for four seasons and was the top goal scorer in the Eliteprospects during the 2001-02 season with 22 goals. In 2004, he returned to Frölunda, eight years after leaving the team for Finland.  He then played for SC Langnau in Switzerland's Nationalliga A and for Füchse Duisburg in the German Deutsche Eishockey Liga before rejoining Rögle in 2008, who were now playing in Elitserien. He remained until his retirement from playing in 2010.

After retiring, he became a sports manager for Halmstad HF.

Career statistics

Regular season and playoffs

International

External links

1976 births
Espoo Blues players
Füchse Duisburg players
Frölunda HC players
Living people
Lukko players
Modo Hockey players
New York Islanders draft picks
Rögle BK players
SC Langnau players
Swedish ice hockey right wingers
Swedish expatriate ice hockey players in Germany